Sunny is a Japanese slice of life manga series written and illustrated by Taiyō Matsumoto. It was serialized in Shogakukan's seinen manga magazine Monthly Ikki from December 2010 to September 2014, when the magazine ceased publication. It was later transferred to Monthly Big Comic Spirits, being serialized from January to July 2015. Its chapters were collected in six wide-ban volumes. The manga was licensed for English release in North America by Viz Media.

Sunny won the 61st Shogakukan Manga Award in the General category in 2016 and received an Excellence Award at the 20th Japan Media Arts Festival in 2017.

Plot
Sunny is the story about the foster children of the Star Kids home, a combination group home/orphanage facility. They struggle with both the everyday issues of growing up and those specific of being abandoned or orphaned children. Their only way out from their situation is the Sunny, a dilapidated old car in the front lawn of the home. The Sunny is used by the children to go magically wherever they want, travel the world, go into space, or just find a refuge from the troubles of reality.

Characters

He deeply cares about the other kids at the home, getting in trouble if it requires it to help them. Her mother left him in the Star Kids and they reunite on occasion. Haruo keeps a round tin of Nivea which reminds him her smell.

A bespectacled smart quiet boy and a newcomer to the Star Kids. He feels uneasy at the home and does not really try at the beginning to connect with the other kids, believing that his parents will come back any day now.

An artistic, musically-inclined and playful boy. He was sent to the home along with his little brother . They visit their ill mother at the hospital.

A sensitive girl, burdened with the memories of a caring family since her parents died. She fears dying alone and wants no one else to leave her. Megumu always thinks the best of others and tries to be a "normal" girl. She is befriended with Kiko.

A scandalous and whining girl, defensive of her peers. Her mother left her in the Star Kids.

A teenager and one of the older kids at the home. He is nicknamed "Horny Kenji" after his porn magazines were found inside the Sunny. He is the son of an alcoholic father. He does not  know what he wants out of life and even tried to drop out of school.

Kenji's older sister and high school student. She also takes care of the kids at the Star Kids.

An obese large man with an undisclosed mental issue who is usually wandering around the home, picking flowers and singing nursery rhymes. He also serves as a guardian of the home and the kids.

Mr. Adachi is the caretaker of the Star Kids, along with Miss Mitsuko. He is a compassionate and patient man who is always looking for the well-being of the kids. 

The grandson of the Star Kids housemaster. He is admired by the kids, specially by Haruo. He is a college student, but is aimlessly searching for his purpose in life.

Production
Matsumoto stated that he has planned since his debut on writing a manga about his own experience living in a children's care home for six years when he was young,  but he thought that it would be strange to start a career as a manga artist with a theme like that. Matsumoto also said that Sunny is not an autobiographical work, clarifying that there are parts close to his own experiences, while others were mostly made up, adding as well, that at first he planned on making it more autobiographical, but he could not make it work, so it wounded up being "half real and half fiction". For the series, Matsumoto decided to use the Kansai dialect for dialogues to make the story more light-hearted. Matsumoto's previous works have been noted for lack of female characters, whereas in Sunny they are more prominent, as Matsumoto was basing the work on his own experience and half of the kids at the home were girls. Matsumoto's wife helped him drawing the female characters.

Publication
Sunny, written and illustrated by Taiyō Matsumoto, was serialized in Shogakukan's Monthly Ikki from December 25, 2010, to September 25, 2014, when Ikki suspended its publication. The manga was later transferred to Monthly Big Comic Spirits, being serialized from January 27 to July 27, 2015. Shogakukan collected its chapters in six wide-ban volumes, released from August 30, 2011, to October 30, 2015.

The manga has been licensed for English-language release by Viz Media in 2012. The six volumes were released from May 21, 2013, to November 15, 2016.

Volume list

Reception
Sunny was one of the Jury Recommended Works at the 15th and 16th Japan Media Arts Festival in 2011 and 2012, and received an Excellence Award at the 20th edition in 2017. In 2016, the manga won the 61st Shogakukan Manga Award in the General category, sharing it with Umimachi Diary. It won the award for Best Graphic Novel at the 2nd Cartoonist Studio Prize. It was nominated for Best American Edition of Foreign Material at the 2014 Harvey Awards. It was also picked as a nominee for 'Best Comic' in the 42nd and the 44th annual Angoulême International Comics Festival held in 2015 and 2017 respectively. 

The first volume of Sunny was chosen as one of the Great Graphic Novels 2014 in the fiction section by the Young Adult Library Services Association. It was one of the fifty manga titles selected for a manga exhibition about the promotion of human rights, held by the Tokyo Metropolitan Human Rights Promotion Center in 2015.

On Anime News Network, Rebecca Silverman gave volume 1 an overall grade of B+. Greg McElhatton of Comic Book Resources praised the art and claimed it was "the most accessible Matsumoto manga to date" in his review of the first volume. Publishers Weekly wrote that the author "deftly weaves a sense of longing and sadness into even the most chaotic scenes, and readers are drawn into the lives of children struggling to be themselves in a world that doesn’t want them."

References

Further reading

External links
 

2010 manga
Comics about orphans
Drama anime and manga
Seinen manga
Shogakukan manga
Slice of life anime and manga
Taiyō Matsumoto
Viz Media manga
Winners of the Shogakukan Manga Award for general manga